COINTELPRO (syllabic abbreviation derived from Counter Intelligence Program; 1956–1971) was a series of covert and illegal projects actively conducted by the United States Federal Bureau of Investigation (FBI) aimed at surveilling, infiltrating, discrediting, and disrupting domestic American political organizations. FBI records show COINTELPRO resources targeted groups and individuals the FBI deemed subversive, including feminist organizations, the Communist Party USA, anti–Vietnam War organizers, activists of the civil rights and Black power movements (e.g. Martin Luther King Jr., the Nation of Islam, and the Black Panther Party), environmentalist and animal rights organizations, the American Indian Movement (AIM), Chicano and Mexican-American groups like the Brown Berets and the United Farm Workers, independence movements (including Puerto Rican independence groups such as the Young Lords and the Puerto Rican Socialist Party), a variety of organizations that were part of the broader New Left, and white supremacist groups such as the Ku Klux Klan and the far-right group National States' Rights Party.

In 1971 in San Diego, the FBI financed, armed, and controlled an extreme right-wing group of former members of the Minutemen anti-communist paramilitary organization, transforming it into a group called the Secret Army Organization that targeted groups, activists, and leaders involved in the Anti-War Movement, using both intimidation and violent acts.

The FBI has used covert operations against domestic political groups since its inception; however, covert operations under the official COINTELPRO label took place between 1956 and 1971. Many of the tactics used in COINTELPRO are alleged to have seen continued use including; discrediting targets through psychological warfare; smearing individuals and groups using forged documents and by planting false reports in the media; harassment; wrongful imprisonment; illegal violence; and assassination. According to a Senate report, the FBI's motivation was "protecting national security, preventing violence, and maintaining the existing social and political order".

Beginning in 1969, leaders of the Black Panther Party were targeted by the COINTELPRO and "neutralized" by being assassinated, imprisoned, publicly humiliated or falsely charged with crimes. Some of the Black Panthers targeted include Fred Hampton, Mark Clark, Zayd Shakur, Geronimo Pratt, Mumia Abu-Jamal, and Marshall Conway. Common tactics used by COINTELPRO were perjury, witness harassment, witness intimidation, and withholding of exculpatory evidence.

FBI Director J. Edgar Hoover issued directives governing COINTELPRO, ordering FBI agents to "expose, disrupt, misdirect, discredit, or otherwise neutralize" the activities of these movements and especially their leaders. Under Hoover, the agent in charge of COINTELPRO was William C. Sullivan. Attorney General Robert F. Kennedy personally authorized some of the programs, giving written approval for limited wiretapping of Martin Luther King's phones "on a trial basis, for a month or so". Hoover extended the clearance so his men were "unshackled" to look for evidence in any areas of King's life they deemed worthy.

History

Centralized operations under COINTELPRO officially began in August 1956 with a program designed to "increase factionalism, cause disruption and win defections" inside the Communist Party USA (CPUSA). Tactics included anonymous phone calls, Internal Revenue Service (IRS) audits, and the creation of documents that would divide the American communist organization internally. An October 1956 memo from Hoover reclassified the FBI's ongoing surveillance of black leaders, including it within COINTELPRO, with the justification that the movement was infiltrated by communists. In 1956, Hoover sent an open letter denouncing Dr. T. R. M. Howard, a civil rights leader, surgeon, and wealthy entrepreneur in Mississippi who had criticized FBI inaction in solving recent murders of George W. Lee, Emmett Till, and other African Americans in the South. When the Southern Christian Leadership Conference (SCLC), an African-American civil rights organization, was founded in 1957, the FBI began to monitor and target the group almost immediately, focusing particularly on Bayard Rustin, Stanley Levison, and eventually Martin Luther King Jr.

After the 1963 March on Washington for Jobs and Freedom, Hoover singled out King as a major target for COINTELPRO. Under pressure from Hoover to focus on King, Sullivan wrote:

Soon after, the FBI was systematically bugging King's home and his hotel rooms, as they were now aware that King was growing in stature daily as the most prominent leader of the civil rights movement.

In the mid-1960s, King began to publicly criticize the Bureau for giving insufficient attention to the use of terrorism by white supremacists. Hoover responded by publicly calling King the most "notorious liar" in the United States. In his 1991 memoir, Washington Post journalist Carl Rowan asserted that the FBI had sent at least one anonymous letter to King encouraging him to commit suicide. Historian Taylor Branch documents an anonymous "suicide package" sent by the FBI on November 21, 1964, that contained audio recordings obtained through tapping King's phone and placing bugs throughout various hotel rooms over the past two years, and that was created two days after the announcement of King's impending Nobel Peace Prize. The tape, which was prepared by FBI audio technician John Matter, documented a series of sexual indiscretions by King combined with a letter telling him: "There is only one way out for you. You better take it before your filthy, abnormal, fraudulent self is bared to the nation". King was subsequently informed that the audio would be released to the media if he did not acquiesce and commit suicide prior to accepting his Nobel Peace Prize. When King refused to satisfy their coercion tactics, FBI Associate Director, Cartha D. DeLoach, commenced a media campaign offering the surveillance transcript to various news organizations, including Newsweek and Newsday. Even by 1969, as has been noted elsewhere, "[FBI] efforts to 'expose' Martin Luther King Jr. had not slackened even though King had been dead for a year. [The Bureau] furnished ammunition to opponents that enabled attacks on King's memory, and ... tried to block efforts to honor the slain leader."

During the same period the program also targeted Malcolm X. While an FBI spokesman has denied that the FBI was "directly" involved in Malcolm's murder in 1965, it is documented that the Bureau worked to "widen the rift" between Malcolm and Elijah Muhammad through infiltration and the "sparking of acrimonious debates within the organization", rumor-mongering, and other tactics designed to foster internal disputes, which ultimately led to Malcolm's assassination. The FBI heavily infiltrated Malcolm's Organization of Afro-American Unity in the final months of his life. The Pulitzer Prize-winning biography of Malcolm X by Manning Marable asserts that most of the men who plotted Malcolm's assassination were never apprehended and that the full extent of the FBI's involvement in his death cannot be known.

Amidst the urban unrest of July–August 1967, the FBI began "COINTELPRO–BLACK HATE", which focused on King and the SCLC, as well as the Student Nonviolent Coordinating Committee (SNCC), the Revolutionary Action Movement (RAM), the Deacons for Defense and Justice, Congress of Racial Equality (CORE), and the Nation of Islam. BLACK HATE established the Ghetto Informant Program and instructed 23 FBI offices to "disrupt, misdirect, discredit, or otherwise neutralize the activities of black nationalist hate type organizations".

A March 1968 memo stated the program's goal was to "prevent the coalition of militant black nationalist groups"; to "Prevent the RISE OF A 'MESSIAH' who could unify ... the militant black nationalist movement"; "to pinpoint potential troublemakers and neutralize them before they exercise their potential for violence [against authorities]"; to "Prevent militant black nationalist groups and leaders from gaining RESPECTABILITY, by discrediting them to ... both the responsible community and to liberals who have vestiges of sympathy"; and to "prevent the long-range GROWTH of militant black organizations, especially among youth". Dr. King was said to have potential to be the "messiah" figure, should he abandon nonviolence and integrationism, and Kwame Ture was noted to have "the necessary charisma to be a real threat in this way" as he was portrayed as someone who espoused a much more militant vision of "black power". While the FBI was particularly concerned with leaders and organizers, they did not limit their scope of target to the heads of organizations. Individuals such as writers were also listed among the targets of operations.

This program coincided with a broader federal effort to prepare military responses for urban riots and began increased collaboration between the FBI, Central Intelligence Agency, National Security Agency, and the Department of Defense. The CIA launched its own domestic espionage project in 1967 called Operation CHAOS. A particular target was the Poor People's Campaign, a national effort organized by King and the SCLC to occupy Washington, DC. The FBI monitored and disrupted the campaign on a national level, while using targeted smear tactics locally to undermine support for the march. The Black Panther Party was another targeted organization, wherein the FBI collaborated to destroy the party from the inside out.

Overall, COINTELPRO encompassed disruption and sabotage of the Socialist Workers Party (1961), the Ku Klux Klan (1964), the Nation of Islam, the Black Panther Party (1967), and the entire New Left social/political movement, which included antiwar, community, and religious groups (1968). A later investigation by the Senate's Church Committee (see below) stated that "COINTELPRO began in 1956, in part because of frustration with Supreme Court rulings limiting the Government's power to proceed overtly against dissident groups." Official congressional committees and several court cases have concluded that COINTELPRO operations against communist and socialist groups exceeded statutory limits on FBI activity and violated constitutional guarantees of freedom of speech and association.

Program revealed 

The program was secret until March 8, 1971, when the Citizens' Commission to Investigate the FBI burgled an FBI field office in Media, Pennsylvania, took several dossiers, and exposed the program by passing this material to news agencies. The boxing match known as the Fight of the Century between Muhammad Ali and Joe Frazier in March 1971 provided cover for the activist group to successfully pull off the burglary. Muhammad Ali was a COINTELPRO target because he had joined the Nation of Islam and the anti-war movement.

Many news organizations initially refused to immediately publish the information, with the notable exception of The Washington Post. After affirming the reliability of the documents, it published them on the front page (in defiance of the Attorney General's request), prompting other organizations to follow suit. Within the year, Director J. Edgar Hoover declared that the centralized COINTELPRO was over, and that all future counterintelligence operations would be handled case by case.

Additional documents were revealed in the course of separate lawsuits filed against the FBI by NBC correspondent Carl Stern, the Socialist Workers Party, and a number of other groups. In 1976 the Select Committee to Study Governmental Operations with Respect to Intelligence Activities of the United States Senate, commonly referred to as the "Church Committee" after its chairman, Senator Frank Church (D-Idaho), launched a major investigation of the FBI and COINTELPRO. Many released documents have been partly or entirely redacted.

The Final Report of the Select Committee castigated the conduct of the intelligence community in its domestic operations (including COINTELPRO) in no uncertain terms:

The Church Committee documented a history of the FBI (initially called BOI until 1936) exercising political repression as far back as World War I, and through the 1920s, when agents were charged with rounding up "anarchists, communists, socialists, reformists and revolutionaries" for deportation. From 1936 through 1976, the domestic operations were increased against political and anti-war groups.

Intended effects
The intended effect of the FBI's COINTELPRO was to "expose, disrupt, misdirect, or otherwise neutralize" groups that the FBI officials believed were "subversive" by instructing FBI field operatives to:
 Create a negative public image for target groups (for example through surveilling activists and then releasing negative personal information to the public)
 Break down internal organization by creating conflicts (for example, by having agents exacerbate racial tensions, or send anonymous letters to try to create conflicts)
 Create dissension between groups (for example, by spreading rumors that other groups were stealing money)
 Restrict access to public resources (for example, by pressuring non-profit organizations to cut off funding or material support)
 Restrict the ability to organize protest (for example, through agents promoting violence against police during planning and at protests)
 Restrict the ability of individuals to participate in group activities (for example, by character assassinations, false arrests, surveillance)

Range of targets
At its inception, the program's main target was the Communist Party.

In an interview with the BBC's Andrew Marr in February 1996, Noam Chomsky—a political activist and MIT professor of linguistics—spoke about the purpose and the targets of COINTELPRO, saying:

According to the Church Committee:

Examples of surveillance, spanning all presidents from FDR to Nixon, both legal and illegal, contained in the Church Committee report:
 President Roosevelt (1933–1945) asked the FBI to put in its files the names of citizens sending telegrams to the White House opposing his "national defense" policy and supporting Col. Charles Lindbergh.
 President Truman (1945–1953) received inside information on a former Roosevelt aide's efforts to influence his appointments, labor union negotiating plans, and the publishing plans of journalists.
 President Eisenhower (1953–1961) received reports on purely political and social contacts with foreign officials by Bernard Baruch, Eleanor Roosevelt, and Supreme Court Justice William O. Douglas.
 The Kennedy administration (1961–1963) had the FBI wiretap a congressional staff member, three executive officials, a lobbyist, and a Washington law firm. US Attorney General Robert F. Kennedy received the fruits of an FBI wire tap on Martin Luther King Jr. and an electronic listening device targeting a congressman, both of which yielded information of a political nature.
 President Johnson (1963–1969) asked the FBI to conduct "name checks" of his critics and members of the staff of his 1964 opponent, Senator Barry Goldwater. He also requested purely political intelligence on his critics in the Senate, and received extensive intelligence reports on political activity at the 1964 Democratic Convention from FBI electronic surveillance.
 President Nixon (1969–1974) authorized a program of wiretaps, which produced for the White House purely political or personal information unrelated to national security, including information about a Supreme Court Justice.

Groups that were known to be targets of COINTELPRO operations include:
 Communist and socialist organizations.
 Organizations and individuals associated with the civil rights movement, including Dr. Martin Luther King Jr. and others associated with the Southern Christian Leadership Conference, the National Association for the Advancement of Colored People, the Congress of Racial Equality, and other civil rights organizations.
 Black nationalist groups.
 The Young Lords.
 The American Indian Movement.
 White supremacist groups, including the Ku Klux Klan.
 The National States' Rights Party.
 A broad range of organizations labeled "New Left", Students for a Democratic Society the Weathermen, and environmental activists.
 Almost all groups protesting the Vietnam War, as well as individual student demonstrators with no group affiliation.
 The National Lawyers Guild.
 Organizations and individuals associated with the women's rights movement.
 Nationalist groups such as those seeking independence for Puerto Rico, reunification of Ireland, and Cuban exile movements including Orlando Bosch's Cuban Power and the Cuban Nationalist Movement.
 Additional notable American individuals.

The COINTELPRO operators targeted multiple groups at once and encouraged splintering of these groups from within. In letter-writing campaigns (wherein false letters were sent on behalf of members of parties), the FBI ensured that groups would not unite in their causes. For instance, they launched a campaign specifically to alienate the Black Panther Party from the Mau Maus, Young Lords, Young Patriots and SDS. These racially diverse groups had been building alliances, in part due to charismatic leaders such as Fred Hampton and his attempts to create a "Rainbow Coalition". The FBI was concerned with ensuring that groups could not gain traction through unity, specifically across racial lines. One of the main ways of targeting these groups was to arouse suspicion between the different parties and causes. In this way the bureau took on a divide-and-conquer offensive.

The COINTELPRO documents show numerous cases of the FBI's intentions to prevent and disrupt protests against the Vietnam War. Many techniques were used to accomplish this task. "These included promoting splits among antiwar forces, encouraging red-baiting of socialists, and pushing violent confrontations as an alternative to massive, peaceful demonstrations." One 1966 COINTELPRO operation tried to redirect the Socialist Workers Party from their pledge of support for the antiwar movement.

The FBI has said that it no longer undertakes COINTELPRO or COINTELPRO-like operations. However, critics have claimed that agency programs in the spirit of COINTELPRO targeted groups such as the Committee in Solidarity with the People of El Salvador, the American Indian Movement, Earth First!, and the anti-globalization movement.

Methods

According to attorney Brian Glick in his book War at Home, the FBI used five main methods during COINTELPRO:
 Infiltration: Agents and informers did not merely spy on political activists. Their main purpose was to discredit, disrupt and negatively redirect action. Their very presence served to undermine trust and scare off potential supporters. The FBI and police exploited this fear to smear genuine activists as agents.
 Psychological warfare: The FBI and police used a myriad of "dirty tricks" to undermine movements. They planted false media stories and published bogus leaflets and other publications in the name of targeted groups. They forged correspondence, sent anonymous letters, and made anonymous telephone calls. They spread misinformation about meetings and events, set up pseudo movement groups run by government agents, and manipulated or strong-armed parents, employers, landlords, school officials, and others to cause trouble for activists. They used bad-jacketing to create suspicion about targeted activists, sometimes with lethal consequences.
 Harassment via the legal system: The FBI and police abused the legal system to harass dissidents and make them appear to be criminals. Officers of the law gave perjured testimony and presented fabricated evidence as a pretext for false arrests and wrongful imprisonment. They discriminatorily enforced tax laws and other government regulations and used conspicuous surveillance, "investigative" interviews, and grand jury subpoenas in an effort to intimidate activists and silence their supporters.
 Illegal force: The FBI conspired with local police departments to threaten dissidents; to conduct illegal break-ins in order to search dissident homes; and to commit vandalism, assaults, beatings and assassinations. The objective was to frighten or eliminate dissidents and disrupt their movements.
 Undermine public opinion: One of the primary ways the FBI targeted organizations was by challenging their reputations in the community and denying them a platform to gain legitimacy. Hoover specifically designed programs to block leaders from "spreading their philosophy publicly or through the communications media". Furthermore, the organization created and controlled negative media meant to undermine black power organizations. For instance, they oversaw the creation of "documentaries" skillfully edited to paint the Black Panther Party as aggressive, and false newspapers that spread misinformation about party members. The ability of the FBI to create distrust within and between revolutionary organizations tainted their public image and weakened chances at unity and public support.

The FBI specifically developed tactics intended to heighten tension and hostility between various factions in the black power movement, for example between the Black Panthers and the US Organization. For instance, the FBI sent a fake letter to the US Organization exposing a supposed Black Panther plot to murder the head of the US Organization, Ron Karenga. They then intensified this by spreading falsely attributed cartoons in the black communities pitting the Black Panther Party against the US Organization. This resulted in numerous deaths, among which were San Diego Black Panther Party members John Huggins, Bunchy Carter and Sylvester Bell. Another example of the FBI's anonymous letter writing campaign is how they turned the Blackstone Rangers head, Jeff Fort, against former ally Fred Hampton, by stating that Hampton had a hit on Fort. They also were instrumental in developing the rift between Black Panther Party leaders Eldridge Cleaver and Huey Newton, as executed through false letters inciting the two leaders of the Black Panther Party.

Dhoruba Bin Wahad, a former Black Panther, reflects on how these tactics made him feel, saying he had a combat mentality and felt like he was at war with the government. When asked about why he thinks the Black Panthers were targeted he said, "In the United States, the equivalent of the military was the local police. During the early sixties, at the height of the civil rights movement, and the human rights movement, the police in the United States became increasingly militaristic. They began to train out of military bases in the United States. The Law Enforcement Assistance Act supplied local police with military technology, everything from assault rifles to army personnel carriers. In his opinion, the Counterintelligence Program went hand-in-hand with the militarization of the police in the Black community, with the militarization of police in America."

The FBI also conspired with the police departments of many U.S. cities (San Diego, Los Angeles, San Francisco, Oakland, Philadelphia, Chicago) to encourage repeated raids on Black Panther homes—often with little or no evidence of violations of federal, state, or local laws—which resulted in the police killing many members of the Black Panther Party, most notably Chicago Black Panther Party Chairman Fred Hampton on December 4, 1969. Whether or not the FBI sanctioned his killing remains unproven. Before the death of Hampton, long-term infiltrator, William O'Neal, shared floor plans of his apartment with the COINTELPRO team. He then gave Hampton a dose of secobarbital that rendered Hampton unconscious during the raid on his home.

In order to eliminate black militant leaders whom they considered dangerous, the FBI is believed to have worked with local police departments to target specific individuals, accuse them of crimes they did not commit, suppress exculpatory evidence and falsely incarcerate them. Elmer "Geronimo" Pratt, a Black Panther Party leader, was incarcerated for 27 years before a California Superior Court vacated his murder conviction, ultimately freeing him. Appearing before the court, an FBI agent testified that he believed Pratt had been framed, because both the FBI and the Los Angeles Police Department knew he had not been in the area at the time the murder occurred.

Some sources claim that the FBI conducted more than 200 "black bag jobs", which were warrantless surreptitious entries, against the targeted groups and their members.

In 1969 the FBI special agent in San Francisco wrote Hoover that his investigation of the Black Panther Party had concluded that in his city, at least, the Panthers were primarily engaged in feeding breakfast to children. Hoover fired back a memo implying the agent's career goals would be directly affected by his supplying evidence to support Hoover's view that the Black Panther Party was "a violence-prone organization seeking to overthrow the Government by revolutionary means".

Hoover supported using false claims to attack his political enemies. In one memo he wrote: "Purpose of counterintelligence action is to disrupt the Black Panther Party and it is immaterial whether facts exist to substantiate the charge."

In one particularly controversial 1965 incident, white civil rights worker Viola Liuzzo was murdered by Ku Klux Klansmen, who gave chase and fired shots into her car after noticing that her passenger was a young black man; one of the Klansmen was Gary Thomas Rowe, an acknowledged FBI informant. The FBI spread rumors that Liuzzo was a member of the Communist Party and had abandoned her children to have sexual relationships with African Americans involved in the civil rights movement. FBI records show that J. Edgar Hoover personally communicated these insinuations to President Johnson.

FBI informant Rowe has also been implicated in some of the most violent crimes of the 1960s civil rights era, including attacks on the Freedom Riders and the 1963 Birmingham, Alabama 16th Street Baptist Church bombing.

The FBI also financed, armed, and controlled an extreme right-wing group of former Minutemen, transforming it into a group called the Secret Army Organization that targeted groups, activists, and leaders involved in the Anti-War Movement, using both intimidation and violent acts.

Hoover ordered preemptive action "to pinpoint potential troublemakers and neutralize them before they exercise their potential for violence."

Illegal surveillance
The final report of the Church Committee concluded:

Too many people have been spied upon by too many Government agencies and too much information has been illegally collected. The Government has often undertaken the secret surveillance of citizens on the basis of their political beliefs, even when those beliefs posed no threat of violence or illegal acts on behalf of a hostile foreign power. The Government, operating primarily through secret and biased informants, but also using other intrusive techniques such as wiretaps, microphone "bugs", surreptitious mail opening, and break-ins, has swept in vast amounts of information about the personal lives, views, and associations of American citizens. Investigations of groups deemed potentially dangerous—and even of groups suspected of associating with potentially dangerous organizations—have continued for decades, despite the fact that those groups did not engage in unlawful activity.

Groups and individuals have been assaulted, repressed, harassed and disrupted because of their political views, social beliefs and their lifestyles. Investigations have been based upon vague standards whose breadth made excessive collection inevitable. Unsavory, harmful and vicious tactics have been employed—including anonymous attempts to break up marriages, disrupt meetings, ostracize persons from their professions, and provoke target groups into rivalries that might result in deaths. Intelligence agencies have served the political and personal objectives of presidents and other high officials. While the agencies often committed excesses in response to pressure from high officials in the Executive branch and Congress, they also occasionally initiated improper activities and then concealed them from officials whom they had a duty to inform.

Governmental officials—including those whose principal duty is to enforce the law—have violated or ignored the law over long periods of time and have advocated and defended their right to break the law.

The Constitutional system of checks and balances has not adequately controlled intelligence activities. Until recently the Executive branch has neither delineated the scope of permissible activities nor established procedures for supervising intelligence agencies. Congress has failed to exercise sufficient oversight, seldom questioning the use to which its appropriations were being put. Most domestic intelligence issues have not reached the courts, and in those cases when they have reached the courts, the judiciary has been reluctant to grapple with them.

Later similar operations
While COINTELPRO was officially terminated in April 1971, domestic espionage continued. Between 1972 and 1974, it is documented that the Bureau planted over 500 bugs without a warrant and opened over 2,000 pieces of personal mail. More recent targets of covert action include the American Indian Movement (AIM), Earth First!, and Committees in Solidarity with the People of El Salvador. Documents released under the FOIA show that the FBI tracked the late David Halberstam—a Pulitzer Prize-winning journalist and author—for more than two decades. "Counterterrorism" guidelines implemented during the Reagan administration have been described as allowing a return to COINTELPRO tactics. Some radical groups accuse factional opponents of being FBI informants or assume the FBI is infiltrating the movement. COINTELPRO survivor Filiberto Ojeda Rios was killed by the FBI's hostage rescue team in 2005, his death described by a United Nations special committee as an assassination.

Environmentalist Eric McDavid convicted on arson charges was released after documents emerged demonstrating that the FBI informant in his Earth Liberation Front group provided crucial leadership, information, and material without which the crime could not have been committed, repeating the same pattern of behavior of COINTELPRO. It has been claimed these sorts of practices have become widespread in FBI "counter-terrorism" cases targeting Muslims in the 2009 Bronx terrorism plot and others.

Authors such as Ward Churchill, Rex Weyler, and Peter Matthiessen allege that the federal government intended to acquire uranium deposits on the Lakota tribe's reservation land, and that this motivated a larger government conspiracy against AIM activists on the Pine Ridge reservation. Others believe COINTELPRO continues and similar actions are being taken against activist groups. Caroline Woidat says that, with respect to Native Americans, COINTELPRO should be understood within a historical context in which "Native Americans have been viewed and have viewed the world themselves through the lens of conspiracy theory." Other authors argue that while some conspiracy theories related to COINTELPRO are unfounded, the issue of ongoing government surveillance and repression is real.

FBI Agent Richard G. Held is known to have increased FBI support for the Guardians of the Oglala Nation (GOON) squads, who were a private paramilitary group established in 1972 by the elected tribal chairman, Dick Wilson under authority of the Oglala Sioux. AIM accused GOONs of involvement in 300 assaults and 64 homicides of political opponents. Despite this, The Bureau rarely investigated them and instead used its resources overwhelmingly to prosecute AIM. In 2000, the FBI released a report regarding these alleged unsolved violent deaths on Pine Ridge reservation and accounted for most of the deaths, and disputed the claims of unsolved murders. The report stated that only four deaths were unsolved and that some deaths were not murders.

In April 2018, the Atlanta Black Star characterized the FBI as still engaging in COINTELPRO behavior by surveilling the Black Lives Matter movement. Internal documents dated as late as 2017 showed that the FBI had surveilled the movement. In 2014, the FBI tracked a Black Lives Matter activist using surveillance tactics which The Intercept found "reminiscent of a rich American history of targeting black Americans," including COINTELPRO. This practice, along with the imprisonment of black activists for their views, has been associated with the new FBI designation of "Black Identity Extremists".

Defending Rights & Dissent, a civil liberties group, cataloged known instances of First Amendment abuses and political surveillance by the FBI since 2010. The organization found that the FBI devoted disproportionate resources to spy on peaceful left-leaning civil society groups, including Occupy Wall Street, economic justice advocates, racial justice movements, environmentalists, Abolish ICE, and various anti-war movements.

In December 2012, the FBI released redacted documents in response to a Freedom of Information Act request from the Partnership for Civil Justice Fund (PCJF). Mara Verheyden-Hilliard, the executive director of PCJF, said the documents showed that FBI counterterrorism agents had monitored the Occupy movement from its inception in August 2011 and that the FBI acted improperly by collecting "information on people's free-speech actions" and entering it into "unregulated databases, a vast storehouse of information widely disseminated to a range of law-enforcement and, apparently, private entities" (see Domestic Security Alliance Council). The FBI also communicated with the New York Stock Exchange, banks, private businesses and state and local police forces about the movement. In 2014, the PCJF obtained an additional 4,000 pages of unclassified documents through a Freedom of Information Act request, showing "details of the scrutiny of the Occupy protests in 2011 and 2012 by law enforcement officers, federal officials, security contractors and others."

In October 2020, Katie Reiter, chief of staff to Michigan state Senator Rosemary Bayer, had an FBI task force come to her house and aggressively question her about a draft bill she had recently discussed which would have limited the use of tear gas against protesters. Reiter had discussed the proposed ban on tear gas on a private 90-minute Zoom call with Bayer and a handful of other staffers. Reiter says the two officers refused to answer any questions about how they became aware of her private meeting. The Intercept reported about the incident: “Reiter said that the FBI’s visit left her confused and fearful. ‘It has impacted my sleep, it has caused me quite a bit of anxiety,’ she said. ‘And it has certainly impacted how we talk. I try not to let it, I’ll just be like, ‘No, we’re going to talk about this.’ But it's in my mind all the time.’” A spokesperson for the FBI declined to comment on the record, as did a spokesperson for Zoom.

Notable people targeted

 Ralph Abernathy
 Mumia Abu-Jamal
 Muhammad Ali
 James Baldwin
 Judi Bari
 H. Rap Brown
 Kwame Ture
 Bunchy Carter
 Eldridge Cleaver
 Jeff Fort
 Howard Bruce Franklin
 Fred Hampton
 Tom Hayden
 Ernest Hemingway
 Abbie Hoffman
 Erica Huggins
 Jose Cha Cha Jimenez
 Muhammad Kenyatta
 Clark Kerr
 Martin Luther King Jr.
 Stanley Levison
 Viola Liuzzo
 Malcolm X
 Jessica Mitford
 Huey P. Newton
 Filiberto Ojeda Ríos
 Mario Savio
 Jean Seberg
 Assata Shakur
 Morris Starsky
 John Trudell

See also

 1971, 2014 documentary film on the break-in that first exposed COINTELPRO
 Active measures
 Agent provocateur
 All Power to the People, film documentary by Lee Lew-Lee 1996
 , Pyle revealed a similar program by the U.S. Army
 Cold War
 Denial and deception
 Mark Felt, also known as Deep Throat served as chief inspector of COINTELPRO field operations
 FBI National Security Branch
 Joint Terrorism Task Force
 Joint Threat Research Intelligence Group
 Laird v. Tatum
 Mass surveillance in the United States
 MAINWAY, a database of telephone metadata used by the NSA
 NSA warrantless surveillance (2001–2007)
 Operation Mockingbird
 Patriot Act
 PROFUNC, a similar classified Canadian program which focused primarily on communists and crypto-communists
 Red Squad, police intelligence/anti-dissident units which were later operated under COINTELPRO
 Security
 State terrorism
 Surveillance abuse
 Thermcon
 Zersetzung

References

Sources

Further reading

Books

 
 
 
 
 
 
 
 
 
 
 
 
 Theoharis, Athan, Spying on Americans: Political Surveillance from Hoover to the Huston Plan (Temple University Press, 1978).

Articles

 Drabble, John. "The FBI, COINTELPRO-WHITE HATE and the Decline of Ku Klux Klan Organizations in Mississippi, 1964–1971", Journal of Mississippi History, 66:4, (Winter 2004).
 Drabble, John. "The FBI, COINTELPRO-WHITE HATE and the Decline Ku Klux Klan Organizations in Alabama, 1964–1971", Alabama Review, 61:1, (January 2008): 3–47.
 Drabble, John. "To Preserve the Domestic Tranquility:" The FBI, COINTELPRO-WHITE HATE, and Political Discourse, 1964–1971", Journal of American Studies, 38:3, (August 2004): 297–328.
 Drabble, John. "From White Supremacy to White Power: The FBI's COINTELPRO-WHITE HATE Operation and the 'Nazification' of the Ku Klux Klan in the 1970s," American Studies, 48:3 (Fall 2007): 49–74.
 Drabble, John. "Fighting Black Power-New Left coalitions: Covert FBI media campaigns and American cultural discourse, 1967–1971," European Journal of American Culture, 27:2, (2008): 65–91.
Wolfe-Rocca, Ursula. "Why We Should Teach About the FBI's War on the Civil Rights Movement," Zinn Education Project, (2016).

Lessons 

 Wolfe-Rocca, Ursula. "COINTELPRO: Teaching the FBI's War on the Black Freedom Movement," Zinn Education Project.

FBI files
 Files on FBI's website
 FBI COINTELPRO files on Espionage Program
 FBI COINTELPRO file on Hoodwink
 FBI COINTELPRO files on Puerto Rican Groups
 FBI COINTELPRO files on Cuban Matters
 FBI COINTELPRO files on the New Left
 FBI COINTELPRO files on the Socialist Workers Party
 FBI COINTELPRO files on Black Extremist Groups
 FBI COINTELPRO files on White Hate Groups
 FBI COINTELPRO files Las Vegas
 FBI COINTELPRO files Miami
 FBI COINTELPRO files Baltimore
 FBI COINTELPRO files Alexandria
 FBI COINTELPRO files Charlotte
 FBI COINTELPRO files Indianapolis

U.S. government reports

 U.S. Congress. House. Committee on Internal Security. Hearings on Domestic Intelligence Operations for Internal Security Purposes. 93rd Cong., 2d sess, 1974.
 U.S. Congress. House. Select Committee on Intelligence. Hearings on Domestic Intelligence Programs. 94th Cong., 1st sess, 1975.
 U.S. Congress. Senate. Committee on Government Operations. Permanent Subcommittee on Investigations. Hearings on Riots, Civil and Criminal Disorders. 90th Cong., 1st sess. – 91st Cong., 2d sess, 1967–1970.
 U.S. Congress. Senate. Select Committee to Study Governmental Operations with Respect to Intelligence Activities. Hearings – The National Security Agency and Fourth Amendment Rights. Vol. 6. 94th Cong., 1st sess, 1975.
 U.S. Congress. Senate. Select Committee to Study Governmental Operations with Respect to Intelligence Activities. Hearings – Federal Bureau of Investigation. Vol. 6. 94th Cong., 1st sess, 1975.
 U.S. Congress. Senate. Select Committee to Study Governmental Operations with Respect to Intelligence Activities. Final Report – Book II, Intelligence Activities and the Rights of Americans. 94th Cong., 2d sess, 1976.
 U.S. Congress. Senate. Select Committee to Study Governmental Operations with Respect to Intelligence Activities. Final Report – Book III, Supplementary Detailed Staff Reports on Intelligence Activities and the Rights of Americans. 94th Cong., 2d sess, 1976.
 Final Report of the Select Committee to Study Governmental Operations with Respect to Intelligence Activities. United States Senate, 94th Congress, 2nd Session, April 26 (legislative day, April 14), 1976. [AKA "Church Committee Report"]. Archived at Archive.org by the Boston Public Library
 Senate Select Committee to Study Governmental Operations with Respect to Intelligence Activities: ''Intelligence Reports and the Rights of Americans: Book II''. April 24, 1976.

History of civil rights in the United States
History of law enforcement in the United States
History of racism in the United States
Propaganda in the United States
Political repression
Political repression in the United States
Psychological warfare
Surveillance scandals
Political controversies in the United States
Political imprisonment in the United States
Race-related controversies in the United States
African-American-related controversies
American secret government programs
Federal Bureau of Investigation operations

Counterintelligence
Code names
Federal Bureau of Investigation controversies
Human rights abuses in the United States
Federal Bureau of Investigation misconduct